The National University of Modern Languages (NUMLs) is a multi-campus public university with its main campus located in Islamabad, Pakistan and other campuses in different cities of Pakistan.

Overview
At the foothills of the mighty Himalayas, National University of Modern Languages (NUML) is located in the beautiful capital city of Pakistan, Islamabad. Against the scenic background of the Margalla Hills, it stands tall and proud as an emblem of knowledge and wisdom. The university offers Undergraduate, Graduate and Postgraduate programs in Languages, Linguistics, Social Sciences, Media & Communications, Management Sciences, Electrical & Software Engineering and Computer Sciences. It is one of the largest university in Pakistan which has footprints all over the country in the form of regional campuses.

Vision

To become a leading institution in creating knowledge and competencies for inclusive development

Mission

To foster creative pedagogy, innovative research and inclusive communication

Values

Integrity, Merit, Transparency, Inclusiveness, Social Responsibility, Creativity, Tolerance

History 
The National University of Modern Languages was established as an institute of modern languages in 1969 to help people communicate and understand each other in different oriental and occidental languages, to assimilate different cultures and to act as a springboard for emerging disciplines. Initially, the institute provided language training facilities to the Armed Forced personnel and other government servants. In May 2000, its status was upgraded from an institution to a federal charter University. In achieving this benchmark of an autonomous University, it has crossed many milestones and have overcome many barriers to achieve the status of a respected seat of learning that is contributing new knowledge at local and global level and providing education in 21 occidental and oriental languages. Now, the university has a vibrant and well-grounded research program, offering MS/MPhil and PhD research degrees in various disciplines.

Faculties and departments

Faculty of Engineering and Computer Sciences

 Department of Software Engineering 
 Department of Computer Sciences
 Department of Electrical Engineering
 Department of Mathematics

Faculty of Arts and Humanities 
Department of English for Under-Graduate Studies
Department of English for Graduate Studies

Faculty of Management Studies 
Department of Economics
Department of Management Science
Department of Commerce and Accounting

Faculty of Social Sciences 
Department of Educational Sciences
Department of International Relations & Peace and Conflict Studies
Department of Governance and Public Policy
Department of Media Studies
Department of Pakistan Studies
Department of Islamic Thought and Culture
Department of Applied Psychology
Department of Area Studies China

Faculty of Languages
Department of Arabic Language and Culture
Department of Chinese Language and Culture
Department of English Language Teaching
Department of French Language and Culture
Department of German Language and Culture
Department of Italian Language and Culture
Department of Japanese Language and Culture
Department of Korean Language and Culture
Department of Pakistani Languages
Department of Persian Language and Culture
Department of Russian Language and Culture
Department of South Asian Languages and Cultures
Department of Spanish Language and Culture
Department of Turkish Studies
Department of Urdu Language and Literature
Department of Translation and interpretation

International Institutes, Centers and Chairs Operating at NUML 

 Confucius Institute, China
 Iranology Center, Iran
 King Sejong Institute, Republic of Korea
 Yunus Emre Institute, Turkiye
 Belarusian Language and Culture Chair, Belarus
 Jean Monnet Chair – Europe

Research Journals

Ranking and awards 
NUML is on the way to progress with substantial effort of the faculty members and students. During this journey, NUML achieved international and national rankings. Following are the notable gaining in this journey.

NUML was placed among the 601-800 world universities, out of 1406 institutions in Global Rank and ranked 11th out of 64 institutions in Pakistan by The Times Higher Education Ranking 2022. In the SDG-4, i.e., Quality Education, and SDG-8, i.e., Decent Work & Economic Growth, NUML has been placed at the 4th position among the Pakistani universities.  NUML is placed among top 37 National Universities by HEC in Research Excellence.

Distinguished People 

 General Pervez Musharraf NI(M) TBt
 General Khalid Shameem Wynne NI(M), HI(M) (Late)
 General Raheel Sharif NI(M) HI(M)
 Admiral Muhammad Zakaullah NI(M) HI(M) SI(M) TI(M) (Retd)        
 Admiral Asif Sandila NI(M) HI(M) (Retd)
 Air Chief Marshal Tahir Rafique Butt, TBt, NI(M), HI(M) (Retd)
 Sahabzada Yaqub Khan (Late) [Minister of Foreign Affairs]
 Ms. Zobaida Jalal [Federal Minister]
 Mr. Salman Bashir (Retd) [Foreign Secretary of Pakistan]
 Mr. Masood Khan [President of Azad Kashmir]
 Tehmina Janjua [Foreign Secretary of Pakistan]
 Mr. Kashif Abbasi [Journalist/Anchor Person, Ary News]

Rectors

Alumni 
NUML alumni are pride of institute and they are remarkably performing in their respective fields. Some of leading alumni are as follow.

Establishment of Intellectual Forums 
Different intellectual and academic forums have been established to study and investigate contemporary geo-political challenges and socio-cultural dynamics. Some of these include:-

 NUML Dialogue Forum
 Centre for Regional Studies
 Centre for Research on Languages and Cultures
 Center for Multidisciplinary Research
 NUML Writer's Forum
 NUML Mehfil Forum

NUML Dialogue Forum engages the faculty and the students in critical interactions about the contemporary issues. It has a semi-structured pattern of discussion in which a talk is given by some renowned personality and subsequently a question-answer session follows.

Center for Regional Studies is dedicated to the study and investigation of regional issues which are political, cultural and sociological in nature. It is primarily a research-based center which seeks to explore the significant dynamics related to South Asian Region.

CRLC aims at tracing back the history of languages and cultures to their genesis. Investigating their linkages and role in culture-formation area/era-wise with special emphasis on major civilizations. Developing repository (scripts and audio) – corpus of languages. Publicizing research and providing policy-related input to relevant stakeholder.

Center for Multi-Disciplinary Research (CMR) Established in 2021, provides technical platform for cross-disciplinary research incorporating IT and commercialization. One project has been submitted (FE&CS – FMS) while seven (FE&CS – FoL, FAH, FMS, FSS) are in process. Two publications have been submitted (FE&CS – FMS, FAH) while eleven (FE&CS – FMS, FSS, FoL, FAH) are in process

NUML Writers’ Forum (NWF) established to incentivize and encourage faculty, students and alumni to accomplish research and write books on important socio-economic and political issues. Authors are being facilitated in terms of availability of time, provision of relevant research material, compilation, formatting, editing and publication.

Finally, NUML Mehfil Forum is a cultural and literary forum which organizes various talks and events related to literary and cultural topics. It has a more informal pattern and some intellectual personality is invited for a non-structured talks, poetry recitations, autobiographical narratives and question-answer sessions.

Facts & Figures 
NUML has a huge network of academic collaborations and scholarship awards. Just in the financial year 2021–22, over 1,850 students worth 111 Million PKR were awarded as scholarships. 282 students were awarded HEC Need-based Scholarships (Rs 33.36 Mn). 521 students were given Ehsaas Undergraduate Scholarships (Rs 58.06 Mn). 630 students were given Merit Scholarships (Rs 4.32 Mn). 445 students cases (Ongoing 270 + Fresh 175) - Pakistan Bait-ul-Maal. 08 x Scholarships for Differently-abled Students, Wards of Shuhada and Sports were awarded.

NUML Placement Centre, established July 2021, organizes a number of Corporate Grooming Sessions, Job Fairs and on-Campus Recruitment Drives.

Faculty of Languages represents the linguistic and cultural diversity of NUML and currently it houses 13 departments and offers teaching in 21 languages. The FoL is the real raison d’etre of NUML as back in 1969, it was conceived as a language institute before its development into a multidisciplinary, broad-based university in 2000. Still, language teaching remains its strongest suit as it is the only HEI in Pakistan which offers language teaching at such a large scale. With its unmistakably multicultural and multilingual ambience, it is home to diversity, inclusiveness and cross-national solidarity and harmony.

NUML and University of North Texas (UNT) ran a partnership program to train faculty from 2013 to 2015. As a follow-up, NUML is training 45 faculty members of 6 x newly established universities of Pakistan.

NUML successfully completed English Works Program sponsored by RELO (Regional English Language Office) - US Embassy Islamabad. 135 under-privileged students were trained in communicative, interpersonal and entrepreneurial skills; over 30 students got employment and educational opportunities.

Global Undergraduate Exchange Program is being administered by United States Educational Foundation in Pakistan (USEFP). The program provides opportunities to Pakistanis to study, research and engage with international students, scholars and professionals in the US. This year, 16 students were selected from Pakistan to study in the US for one semester, out of which, 5 were from NUML

Promotion of Sports Culture 

 Almaa Shfan, Won Silver Medal in All Pakistan Inter-Varsity 15th Korean Ambassador National Taekwondo Championship 2022
 NUML Won Inter-University Hockey Championship Zone C
 NUML Won Inter-University Volley-ball Championship Zone C
 Kamyab Jawan Sports Drive Inter-Varsity  - 90 Plus Students Participated in Men (Hockey, Boxing, Judo, Athletics) and Women (Football, Volleyball, Athletics) Sports Events 
 NUML Female student participated in COAS Pakistan Open International Taekwondo Championship – 2021
 Janita Javed, Won Silver Medal in Table Tennis (All KPK Games 2022)
 NUML Won Bronze Medal in All Pakistan Inter-Varsity Boxing Championship
 3 Gold and 4 Silver Medals, Kamyab Jawan Talent Hunt Wrestling - Province Level

Student Facilities

Auditorium 
NUML has a world class auditorium for different events like Convocations, Conferences, Open house job fair etc.

Hostels 

The university is equipped with fully furnished separate hostel facilities for boys and girls. The hostels are specially designed with two primary objectives of safety and comfort. It has round-the-clock security, with stringent security procedures and comfortable apartments that our students enjoy living in. The hostels have state-of-the-art washrooms (toilet and bathing cells). Cleanliness is maintained by the staff on duty. Each hostel room provides an amiable atmosphere and pollution-free environment, conducive to the mental, physical and spiritual development of the students and helps them become self-reliant.

Each Hostel (separate for boys and girls, and also for faculty) in the university is self-contained with amenities such as a reading room, an indoor games room, a lounge and a dining hall with mess.

NUML Video Conferencing 
Video conference facility at NUML is frequently used for conduct of conferences and relaying seminars/workshops/talks or any important academic or non-academic events held in the Islamabad Campus. A video conference setup is also established at the university auditorium through which important events are shared with all regional campuses. Moreover, interviews, interaction with the regional directors and PhD/MPhil scholars’ final defence of thesis are also conducted through this.

Mosque 
The campus also has a beautifully designed, community mosque which is open 24 hours a day. Mosque is located in the heart of the campus near where the university community offers their daily prayers as well as Jumma prayer. The mosque is open to the public for prayer. Daily sermons are delivered in both Arabic and Urdu. The spacious mosque offers separate prayer facilities for men and women.

NUML Placement Center and Job Fair 
NUML Placement Centre, established in July 2021, organizes a number of Corporate Grooming Sessions, Job Fairs and On-Campus Recruitment Drives.

Cafeterias 
NUML has two well-maintained and well-stocked cafeterias which provide hygienic food, throughout the day.

Sports Facilities 
There is a modern gymnasium with latest facilities i.e. basketball, handball, volleyball, badminton courts, table-tennis and weight training gadgets, aerobic and anaerobic fitness machines at NUML. A standard ground for football which is also used for practice of hockey and cricket has also been upgraded. An international standard futsal ground, outdoor volleyball court and a basketball court has also been constructed recently.

Library 
NUML has a dedicated block with two floors for library, it is well furnished and fully air-conditioned. The present library is holding over one hundred and fifty thousand (150,000) books, journals, documents and non-book material on various disciplines. This facility is available 7 days a week.

E-Library 
NUML has established E-Library for its students/scholars and faculty with online access to a wide range of books along with MPhil/PhD thesis.

Research Room and Facilitation Center 
In the library, a dedicated research room and facilitation center with 18 & 28 computers respectively have been established for undergraduate and MPhil/PhD scholars and faculty members. NUML has a valid subscription to HEC digital library, which is extended to faculty, students and researchers. Additional digital library resources are arranged from the HEC which include IEEE and ACM etc. Access of Digital Library resources (on-campus and off-campus) for the students and researches are arranged.

Day-Care Facility 
To facilitate academic and administrative staff members, NUML provides Daycare facility for their kids so that they can perform their duties without stress.

FM Radio 
NUML has FM Radio on fm band 104.6 accessible with in the campus. Its programme cue sheet is also available on website.

Solarization – Main Campus 
On main campus Solarization - 600KW installed (40% of total consumption) and Additional 310KW is being installed (overall 54% of consumption)

NUML – Go Green Project 
NUML took initiated to work on Under NUML's Go green project 2,000 Chinar and 8,000 Rose Plants were planted in last 2 years.

Campuses and branches

Campuses
Campuses of the university are located in the following cities:

Lahore Campus
Faisalabad Campus
Karachi Campus
Multan Campus
Quetta Campus
Peshawar Campus
Hyderabad Campus
Mirpur Campus

Branch
The university also has a branch in Rawalpindi.

References

External links 
 

Pakistan Army universities and colleges
Universities and colleges in Islamabad
Language education in Pakistan
Educational institutions established in 1969
1969 establishments in Pakistan
Public universities and colleges in Pakistan
Engineering universities and colleges in Pakistan